The 1990 NFL season was the 71st regular season of the National Football League (NFL). To increase revenue, the league, for the first time since , reinstated bye weeks, so that all NFL teams would play their 16-game schedule over a 17-week period. Furthermore, the playoff format was expanded from 10 teams to 12 teams by adding another wild card from each conference, thus adding two more contests to the postseason schedule; this format was modified with realignment in 2002 (increasing the division spots per conference from three to four, and decreasing the wild card spots per conference from three to two) before the playoffs expanded to 14 teams in 2020. During four out of the five previous seasons under the 10-team format, at least one team with a 10–6 record missed the playoffs, including the 11–5 Denver Broncos in 1985; meanwhile, the 10–6 San Francisco 49ers won Super Bowl XXIII, leading for calls to expand the playoff format to ensure that 10–6 teams could compete for a Super Bowl win. Ironically, the first sixth-seeded playoff team would not have a 10–6 record, but instead, the New Orleans Saints, with an 8–8 record, took the new playoff spot. 

The season ended with Super Bowl XXV when the New York Giants defeated the Buffalo Bills 20–19 at Tampa Stadium. This would be the first Super Bowl appearance for Buffalo, who would represent the AFC in the next three Super Bowls.

First full season under NFL Commissioner Tagliabue
This was the first full season for Paul Tagliabue as the league's Commissioner, after taking over from Pete Rozelle midway through the previous season. On October 8, the league announced that the Super Bowl Most Valuable Player Award would be named the Pete Rozelle Trophy in the former commissioner's honor.

Player movement

Transactions
On April 2, 1990, Elvis Patterson signed as a Plan B free agent with the Los Angeles Raiders. He was waived on September 3 and later re-signed. He became a special teams standout and earned the nickname Ghost. He was a special teams captain for three years.

Trades
On September 25, 1990, the Dallas Cowboys traded Steve Walsh to the New Orleans Saints for the Saint's first and third round picks in the 1991 NFL Draft and a second round pick (that could become a first round pick based on performance) in the 1992 NFL Draft.

Retirements
Dallas Cowboys defensive end Ed "Too Tall" Jones announced his retirement on June 5, 1990.

Draft

The 1990 NFL Draft was held from April 22 to 23, 1990 at New York City's Marriott Marquis. With the first pick, the Indianapolis Colts selected quarterback Jeff George from the University of Illinois. Selecting seventeenth overall, the Dallas Cowboys would draft Emmitt Smith, who would retire as the NFL's all-time leading rusher.

Officiating changes
Dick Jorgensen, who had been the referee in the previous season's Super Bowl XXIV, was diagnosed in May during the offseason with a rare blood disorder. He died five months later on October 10. For the remainder of the 1990 season, NFL officials wore a black armband on their left sleeve with the white number 60 to honor Jorgensen.

Ben Dreith (a referee in the AFL from 1966-69, and the NFL since the merger) and Fred Wyant (a referee since 1971), were demoted to line judge. Dreith later filed a complaint to the Equal Employment Opportunity Commission after the league fired him after the 1990 season, citing age discrimination as the reason for both his demotion to line judge and his dismissal. Dreith and the NFL would later agree in 1993 to a $165,000 settlement, plus court costs and attorney fees.

Gerald Austin, the side judge for Super Bowl XXIV, and Tom White, were promoted to referee. White became the first official to be promoted to referee after only one season of NFL experience since Jerry Markbreit in 1977 (Tommy Bell (1962) and Brad Allen (2014) were hired straight into the NFL as referees). After one season with having 16 officiating crews in 1989, it was reduced back to 15 crews in 1990 to handle the weekly workload of 14 games (if there were no teams with a bye week).

Ed Hochuli was hired as a back judge (now field judge) and assigned to Howard Roe's crew. Hochuli was promoted to referee two years later.

Major rule changes 
 The rule for unnecessary roughness penalties is clarified so that any player who butts, spears, or rams an opponent risks immediate disqualification.
 The penalty for an illegal forward pass beyond the line of scrimmage is enforced from the spot where any part of the passer's body is beyond the line when the ball is released.
 The following changes are made to try to speed up the game:
 the time interval on the Play Clock (the time limit the offensive team has to snap the ball between plays) after time outs and other administrative stoppages has been reduced from 30 seconds to 25 seconds (the time interval between plays remains the same at 45 seconds);
 whenever a player goes out of bounds, other than in the last two minutes of the first half and the last five minutes of the second half or overtime, the game clock immediately starts when the ball is spotted for the next play and the Referee signals it is ready for play; and
 other than in the last two minutes of the first half and the last five minutes of the second half or overtime the game clock also starts following all declined penalties.
 This was the first season in which NFL teams officially had a bye week; the last time was in 1966, when the league had an odd number of teams at 15.

1990 deaths
 Chet Adams, a three-time AAFC champion with the Cleveland Browns died on October 28, 1990
 Fritz Barzilauskas, a first round selection in the 1947 NFL Draft died on November 30, 1990
 Former tackle Frank Cope died on October 8, 1990
 Halfback Tom Harmon died on March 15, 1990
 Offensive lineman Rufus Mayes died on January 9
 Darryl Usher, a member of the Phoenix Cardinals in the 1989 NFL season was shot and killed on February 24, 1990, in Phoenix, Arizona at age 25.
 On December 21, 1990, Chicago Bears rookie Fred Washington was killed in a car accident. He was a member of the 1984 Texas 4A  State Football Champion Denison YellowJackets and was voted defensive player of the year.

Members of the Pro Football Hall of Fame
 Football coach George Allen died on December 31.
 Bronko Nagurski, also a member of the College Football Hall of Fame, died on January 7, 1990

Preseason

American Bowl
A series of National Football League pre-season exhibition games that were held at sites outside the United States, a total of four games were held in 1990.

Regular season

Scheduling formula

Highlights of the 1990 season included:

Porkchop Bowl: A third game in the heated rivalry between the Dallas Cowboys and Philadelphia Eagles, following the Bounty Bowl of 1989, took place in 1990. Known as the "Porkchop Bowl". The game got its name because Eagles head coach Buddy Ryan choked on a pork chop in the week leading up to the game, Philadelphia won this game as well, 21–20.

Thanksgiving: Two games were played on Thursday, November 22, featuring Denver at Detroit and Washington at Dallas, with Detroit and Dallas winning.

Final standings

Tiebreakers
Cincinnati finished ahead of Houston and Pittsburgh in the AFC Central based on best head-to-head record (3–1 to Oilers’ 2–2 to Steelers’ 1–3).
Houston was the third AFC Wild Card based on better conference record (8–4) than Seattle (7–5) and Pittsburgh (6–6).
Philadelphia finished ahead of Washington in the NFC East based on better division record (5–3 to Redskins’ 4–4).
Tampa Bay was second in NFC Central based on best head-to-head record (5–1) against Detroit (2–4), Green Bay (3–3), and Minnesota (2–4).
Detroit finished third in the NFC Central based on best net division points (minus 8) against Green Bay (minus 40).
Green Bay finished ahead of Minnesota in the NFC Central based on better conference record (5–7 to Vikings’ 4–8).
The L.A. Rams finished ahead of Atlanta in the NFC West based on net points in division (plus 1 to Falcons’ minus 31).

Playoffs

Notable events
 For the first time in NFL history, two teams (the 49ers and the Giants) would start the season 10–0. This would not be equalled until 2009 when the Colts and the Saints both reached 13–0, and was also equalled in 2015 by the Panthers and Patriots.

Records, milestones, and notable statistics
Week 3
 September 24, 1990 – Thurman Thomas of the Buffalo Bills rushed for 214 yards versus the New York Jets. It was the second highest total in the history of Monday Night Football.
Week 6
 October 14, 1990 – Joe Montana set a 49ers record by throwing for 476 yards in one game and throwing six touchdown passes. Jerry Rice set a 49ers record with 5 touchdown receptions and 30 points in one game.
 October 14, 1990 - Barry Word of the Kansas City Chiefs rushes for a team-record 200 yards against the Detroit Lions at Arrowhead. Kansas City won 43–24.
Week 10
November 11, 1990: Derrick Thomas set the NFL single game record of seven quarterback sacks, a feat which occurred against Seattle's Dave Krieg on 1990 Veterans Day. Despite this feat, Krieg eluded a blitzing Thomas on the game's last play and threw a touchdown pass to Paul Skansi, which gave the Seahawks a 17–16 win, their first at Arrowhead Stadium since 1980. The record came close to being matched with three occasions of players reaching six sacks, once by Thomas himself in 1998.
Week 15
December 16, 1990: Warren Moon threw for 527 yards against Kansas City on December 16, 1990, the second-most passing yards ever in a single game.

Statistical leaders

Team

Awards

Coaching changes

Offseason
Atlanta Falcons: Jerry Glanville was named the permanent replacement, after Marion Campbell was fired after the first 12 games of 1989, and Jim Hanifan served as interim for the final four games.
Houston Oilers: Jack Pardee replaced Jerry Glanville.
Los Angeles Raiders: Art Shell became the permanent head coach. Shell served as interim for the last 12 games in 1989 after Mike Shanahan was fired after the first four.
New England Patriots: Rod Rust replaced the fired Raymond Berry.
New York Jets: Bruce Coslet replaced the fired Joe Walton.
Phoenix Cardinals: Joe Bugel was named the permanent replacement, after Gene Stallings was fired after the first 11 games of 1989, and Hank Kuhlmann served as interim for the final five games.

In-season

Cleveland Browns: Bud Carson was fired after nine games, and Jim Shofner served as interim for the final seven games.
Tampa Bay Buccaneers: Ray Perkins was fired after 13 games, and Richard Williamson served as interim for the final three games.

Stadium changes
With New England Patriots founder Billy Sullivan no longer owning the team, having it sold to Victor Kiam in 1988 and Sullivan Stadium being taken over by Robert Kraft, the venue was renamed Foxboro Stadium.

Uniforms changes

Individual teams
 The Atlanta Falcons unveiled new uniforms, switching both their primary jerseys and helmets from red to black. This was the first time the Falcons wore black jerseys since 1970, and the first time they had ever worn black helmets. 
 The New York Jets added black trim to their logo, numbers, and stripes on their pants, and changed their face masks from white to black. They also added green pants to be worn with their white jerseys. 
 The Phoenix Cardinals began wearing red pants with their white jerseys at the request of coach Joe Bugel.
 The San Diego Chargers began wearing navy pants with their white jerseys.

In Week 16 with the Gulf War looming closer, American flag decals were added to the back of the helmets of all players.

Television changes
This was the first season under a new four-year deal with TNT to televise Sunday night football games during the first half of the season. ABC, CBS, NBC, and ESPN also each signed four-year contracts to renew their rights for Monday Night Football, the NFC package, and the AFC package, and Sunday Night Football during the second half of the season, respectively. ABC was also given the rights to televise the additional Saturday AFC and NFC wild card playoff games.

TNT's initial broadcast team consisted of Skip Caray on play-by-play and Pat Haden as color commentator. Fred Hickman became the host of TNT's pregame show, The Stadium Show. ESPN continued to air NFL Primetime during those Sunday nights when TNT aired games, going head-to-head with TNT's pregame show.

After CBS fired Brent Musburger on April 1, 1990, the network decided to overhaul the talent lineup on The NFL Today. Irv Cross was demoted to the position of game analyst, and Will McDonough moved on to NBC's NFL Live!. Greg Gumbel became the new host of The NFL Today , Terry Bradshaw became the new analyst, and Pat O'Brien and Lesley Visser as the new reporters/contributors.

References

 NFL Record and Fact Book
 NFL History 1981–1990 (Last accessed December 8, 2007)
 Total Football: The Official Encyclopedia of the National Football League

National Football League seasons
National Football League